Matthew Smith (died 3 November 1955) was an Irish Fianna Fáil politician. He was a member of Seanad Éireann from 1954 to 1957. He was elected to the 8th Seanad in 1954 by the Industrial and Commercial Panel. He died in office in 1955.

He had previously stood unsuccessfully for Dáil Éireann as a Fianna Fáil candidate for the Dún Laoghaire and Rathdown constituency at the 1951 general election.

References

Year of birth missing
1955 deaths
Fianna Fáil senators
Members of the 8th Seanad
People from County Dublin